Jack Derges is a British actor known for portraying the role of Andy Flynn in the BBC soap opera EastEnders.

Career
Derges made his acting debut in the 2007 Casualty episode "Core Values" as Private Haydon; he returned to the show in 2012 as Ben Shears in the episode "Desperate Remedies". Also, in 2012, Derges appeared in the TV-movie Dungeons & Dragons 3: The Book of Vile Darkness as Grayson and in the first episode of television series Switch, as Miles. In 2013, he appeared in WPC 56 as Bill Pearson and Holby City, for one episode, as Mark Christiansen. He also appeared in the horror film Freak of Nurture, as Jed Warner. In 2015, he appeared in Cucumber as Louis Barman, during the first episode; as a character named only as Energy Drink Vendor, for one episode, in Episodes; as Roger, for one episode, in Crims; as Andy, for one episode, in The Royals and as Simon, for six episodes, in Humans.

Derges made his debut appearance in the BBC soap opera EastEnders as Andy Flynn on 17 March 2016, appearing in 35 episodes and leaving at the conclusion of the storyline. His character's last episode aired on 8 August 2016. In September 2018 he made a further guest appearance in Casualty, as Alan "Al" Marsh. In 2019, he appeared in the BBC medical soap opera Doctors, in the recurring role of Enzo D'Agostino.

Filmography

Awards and nominations

References

External links
 
Agent Profile

Year of birth missing (living people)
Living people
British male actors